Crystal Lake is a lake in Rice County, in the U.S. state of Minnesota.

Crystal Lake was so named on account of its crystal-clear water.

See also
List of lakes in Minnesota

References

Lakes of Minnesota
Lakes of Rice County, Minnesota